The Akron Press was a newspaper serving Akron, Ohio. It was founded in 1898.

It began as the Akron edition of the Cleveland Press Penny, printed in Cleveland and was transported to Akron by train. It gained local flavor when it began being printed in Akron.
By 1903 it was described as "distinct".

By the early 1920s it was competing with the Akron Times. The two then joined together on March 14, 1925 to be The Times-Press, as the town wasn't big enough for both.

L. E. Judd, Akron-Press editor, since circa 1921, was editor of the combined newspaper.

Its stereotyping department was headed by Joseph J. Metker, an international stereotypers, and in 1929 his son Robert succeeded him.

In 1923, for a brief period, Henry C. Segal, worked as a reporter for the Akron Press. 

In 1927, the newspaper was named: The Akron Times-Press which existed till 1938.

References 

Mass media in Akron, Ohio
Newspapers published in Ohio
Publications established in 1898
1898 establishments in Ohio